JOEX-DTV (channel 5), branded as  (also known as EX and  and stylized as TV asahi), is a television station owned and operated by the  subsidiary of certified broadcasting holding company , itself controlled by The Asahi Shimbun Company. The station serves as the flagship of the All-Nippon News Network and its studios are located in Roppongi, Minato, Tokyo.

Headquarters

In 2003, the company headquarters moved to a new building designed by Fumihiko Maki currently located at 6-9-1 Roppongi, Minato, Tokyo, Japan.Some of TV Asahi's departments and subsidiaries, such as TV Asahi Productions and Take Systems, are still located at TV Asahi Center, the company's former headquarters from 1986 to 2003. It is located at Ark Hills, not far from its headquarters.

Branding
TV Asahi's current branding were created by UK design collective Tomato (some members work as the electronic music group Underworld) along with TV Asahi's in-house design department in 2003. It comprises a set of computer-generated "sticks" in white background, which changes in colour and movement along with the background music that accompanies the idents. TV Asahi also uses a brief eyecatch of its sticks animation at the top-left of the screen after commercial breaks. The background music used for TV Asahi's sign-on and sign-off videos are Underworld's Born Slippy .NUXX 2003 and Rez. TV Asahi later updated its sign-on and sign-off video in 2008 with a revised version of computer-generated "sticks" animation and new background music. TV Asahi's slogan New Air, On Air appears at the top of its name. It can be seen on TV Asahi's YouTube channel, which in 2011–12, was replaced by its mascot, Go-Chan.

The company writes its name in lower-case letters, tv asahi, in its logo and public-image materials. Normally, the station branding on-screen appears as either "/tv asahi" or "tv asahi\". The station's watermark appearance is the stick at the top with the station's name at the bottom. The fonts used by TV Asahi for the written parts are Akzidenz Grotesk Bold (English) and Hiragino Kaku Gothic W8 (Japanese).

From 1991 to 2001, TV Asahi was unique among the national television networks for its English language theme song, Join Us, which was used for both the startup and closedown sequences. Before that, from 1977 to 1987, another song was used for these (instrumental only from 1978, formerly with vocals).

History

Pre-launch 
After NHK and Nippon TV were launched in 1953, TV has become an important medium in Japan.However, most of the programs that were aired at that time were vulgar which caused well-known critic Sōichi Ōya to mention in a TV program that TV made people in Japan as "total idiots"; those criticisms already gave birth to the idea of opening an education-focused TV station.On February 17, 1956, the Ministry of Posts issued frequency allocations, and the Kanto Region obtained three licenses in total. Among the three, one of them is used by NHK Educational TV, while the other two were open for private bidding. Among those bidders are film production companies Toho and Toei Company, radio broadcasters Nippon Cultural Broadcasting and Nippon Broadcasting System, and educational publishing group Obunsha.On July 4, 1957, the Ministry of Posts later decided to unify those applications into Tokyo Educational Television (as its tentative name) which was later obtained on July 8.

On October 10, 1957, Tokyo Educational Television held its first shareholders meeting and changed its company name to Nippon Educational Television Co., Ltd. (NET). In November 1 of the same year, the broadcaster was later established.After Fuji TV obtained their broadcast licenses, they set an official start date of broadcast on March 1, 1959. NET advanced their start date of broadcast a month earlier (February 1, 1959).In Christmas Eve of 1958, NET began to have test signal transmissions.On January 9 of the following year, their broadcast license was approved, and test signal transmissions continued every night throughout the month.

As Nippon Educational Television Corporation 
At 9:55am on February 1, 1959, NET signed on, airing at least 6.5 hours of programming per day.By April, this figure was extended to 10 hours.With the launch of the Mainichi Broadcasting System and Kyushu Asahi Broadcasting on March 1, 1960, NET programming started airing on those mentioned broadcasters. Shortly after the start of broadcasts, NET broadcast their first live program, which is the wedding of Crown Prince (now Emperor Emeritus) Akihito and Empress Michiko held on April 10 of the same year.

At the time, its broadcasting license dictated that the network was required to devote at least 50% of its airtime to educational programming, and at least 30% of its airtime to children's educational programming. However, the for-profit educational television model eventually proved to be a failure. In July 1959, average ratings of the network was less than 5%.

In 1960, NET began its transformation into a general-purpose television station. It began to broadcast anime and foreign movies. In December 1960, NET also changed its common name from Nippon Educational Television to NET TV (NETテレビ).The change also made its ratings to reach about 10% after 1963. Although it still ranks at the bottom rank of other rival broadcasters, it has greatly narrowed the gap between it and the other three.

Since April 1961, the station began adding nighttime programming. Two years later, NET announced its arrival into the anime race with the Toei produced Wolf Boy Ken. The first of many Toei Animation productions, its premiere began a long line of animated cartoons and series that the station has aired until today.

In November 1963, NET joined forces with NHK General TV for the first live via satellite telecast in Japanese TV history.

Transition from educational programming to general programming 
The switch to general programming also led to an infighting among the management. In contrast to the then-president of NET TV, Hiroshi Ogawa (from Toei), who was actively promoting entertainment programs, Yoshio Akao (from Obunsha) thought that too many entertainment programs were against the original purpose of the educational TV station and was strongly dissatisfied with the vulgar programs that filled NET TV's program schedule at that time.In November 1964, Akao, together with shareholders other than Toei and Nikkei, Inc., succeeded in its major reorganization, forcing Ogawa to resign from the presidency.Since then, Toei's influence in NET TV has been gradually replaced by Asahi Shimbun.The following year, the Asahi Shimbun appointed to the post of station director Koshiji Miura (former Deputy Minister of Political Affairs).

In the 1960s, NET TV also started airing foreign films as part of its schedule.The NET TV premiere of The Morning Show in 1964 created a trend for a news-talk format on daytime Japanese TV, causing other networks to follow suit, it was the first Japanese morning program in its format.Hyōten, NET TV's drama in 1966, had a 42.7% ratings in its finale.The success of the drama made the network to adjust its target audiences to single and married females.Despite heavily focusing on entertainment programs, they continued to broadcast educational programs, albeit on a limited number of hours every morning. In 1967, NET TV launched the Minkyokyo to strengthen the production of educational programs.In April 1967, they started to broadcast in color TV, and by 1969, all of its programs were broadcast in color.After 1968, many regional broadcasters in Japan began to pop up. This led to the broadcaster launching the All-Nippon News Network on April 1, 1970, the country's 4th national network, with NET producing national news and other nationally produced programming for the regional channels that had joined the network.With the continuous network expansion, NET TV shifted its focus on its target audience again, this time from females, to being family oriented similar to the US PBS.

But the best was yet to come. One year after ANN was launched, the ground-breaking series Kamen Rider, created by Shotaro Ishinomori and produced by Toei, made its national premiere in April 1971 on NET TV and the ANN network. This program ended the long-standing tokusatsu duopoly TBS Television and Fuji TV then had with the then hit Ultra Series franchise almost half a decade ago on TBS and the fact that since 1958, these two were the only Japanese TV stations to air tokusatsu productions so far, TBS the first and Fuji the second. With its hit premiere, a rivalry was beginning to start between the three, with TBS seeing NET's toku programming as a threat. Toei's decision to successfully pitch the series to NET was seen by its staff as revenge for the removal of Hiroshi Ogawa from the NET TV presidency in 1964.

As Asahi National Broadcasting Corporation 
In November 1973, the Ministry of Posts revised its plans on how TV broadcasters would operate, which already includes abolishing education-focused TV broadcasting. Therefore, NET's transformation into a general-purpose television station was complete by that same month, when NET, along with educational channel "Tokyo Channel 12" (now TV Tokyo) in Tokyo applied and received a general purpose television station license. On March of the following year, both ended their broadcasts of educational programming, completing the transition.Japan's major newspapers are also sorting out their holdings in TV stations. Nikkei Newspaper transferred its ownership of NET TV to The Asahi Shimbun, making the latter the largest shareholder of NET TV. On April 1, 1975, the ANN affiliation in the Kansai Region changed hands, from Mainichi Broadcasting System, Asahi Broadcasting Corporation assumed the network affiliation slot. Days later, the channel debuted another Ishinomori creation, Himitsu Sentai Gorenger, yet another Toei production, and it would be a stunning success (this was the same month when Kamen Rider jumped ship to rival TBS with the season premiere of Kamen Rider Stronger, the franchise would return to what is now TV Asahi in 2000). The series marked the beginning of the Super Sentai franchise and established NET as a force to be reckoned with when it came to toku productions and anime.

On April 1, 1977, the corporate name of NET TV was changed to Asahi National Broadcasting Co., Ltd, with the name of its channel changed into TV Asahi.This also symbolizes that the Asahi Shimbun has the right to operate TV Asahi both in name and in essence.Since December 17, 1978, TV Asahi had been broadcasting programs with stereo audio. The corporation also started entering into different ventures such as publishing in the late 70s to gain revenue other than advertising.

In 1977, thanks to his close relationship with Ivan Ivanovich, head of the Japanese Section of the International Department of the Communist Party of the Soviet Union, Koshiji Miura was able to meet with Soviet leader Leonid Brezhnev and help TV Asahi obtain exclusive broadcasting rights for the 1980 Moscow Olympics in Japan. This was the first time that a private TV station in Japan was exclusively granted the broadcasting rights of the Olympic Games, but this was controversial as rival broadcasters including NHK opposed the move.Japan followed the Western countries in boycotting the 1980 Summer Olympics.As a result, TV Asahi only aired high-profile Olympic events and the broadcaster had significant losses in its revenue.

Roppongi HQ Redevelopment 
As the broadcaster expands its business, its HQ was running out of space. Since its HQ was located in a residential area, it became difficult to expand its existing infrastructure.TV Asahi collaborated with property development firm Mori Building Company to redevelop the Roppongi area. While the new HQ was under development, TV Asahi temporarily moved to the newly built studios in Ark Hills. In 1985, the Ark Broadcasting Center was officially completed.As Japan entered into the Economic bubble era, local residents around the Roppongi area had a negative perception towards the redevelopment of the said area, which resulted into delaying the redevelopment plan.The old headquarters was demolished in 2000. Prior to the new headquarters being built on the site, offices of TV Asahi were located in multiple locations around Tokyo, including the studios in Ark Hills.

Pre-transition to TV Asahi Corporation 
The launch of the evening news program "News Station" in 1985 helped TV Asahi establish its viewership advantage at 10pm on weekdays, strengthening its position in news programs.In 1987, All-Nippon News Network had a total of 14 regional affiliated stations, much smaller than the other 3 networks (Japan News Network and Fuji News Network had 25 each & Nippon News Network had 27). However, affected by the economic bubble at that time, Kikuo Tashiro (then president of TV Asahi), announced that it wouldn't open more regional stations which resulted in protest from the existing stations. As a result, the decision was reverted and decided to open 10 more stations.In response to the arrival of satellite TV, TV Asahi established TV Asahi Satellite Corporation in 1991.

After Iwate Asahi Television started broadcasting in 1996, the number of ANN stations reached 26, announcing that the broadcaster has already completed the establishment of its national network.In June of the same year, media tycoon Rupert Murdoch and investor Masayoshi Son planned to buy a large stake of TV Asahi, jeopardizing the status of Asahi Shimbun as the major shareholder.In this regard, Toshitada Nakae personally went to the US to meet Murdoch and asked him not to increase his shareholding to TV Asahi.By the following year, Asahi Shimbun purchased the shares of Asahi TV held by Murdoch and Son.TV Asahi is listed on the Tokyo Stock Exchange since October 3, 2000.Multiple changes happened since 2000 after TV Asahi had been staying in the same 4th place for 10 consecutive years in TV ratings.In April 2000, major changes in its schedules, such as starting its programs a few minutes before the top of the hour and improving its entertainment programming at late-night. TV Asahi launched BS Asahi in December 2000, the satellite version of its main terrestrial channel.

Return to Roppongi and renaming to TV Asahi Corporation 
On September 29, 2003, TV Asahi moved back its head office from its Ark Hills Studio to Roppongi Hills. On October 1, the company changed its name to TV Asahi Corporation, with the name presented as TV asahi on-screen.As part of digital broadcasting, TV Asahi started to broadcast on digital TV, being designated to channel 5. In 2004, TV Asahi's ratings reached 7.5% ranking third among the commercial broadcasters in the Kanto Region after a lapse of 32 years.The ratings would further improve by the following year, ranking first in late-night TV ratings.However, in 2008, affected by the global recession, TV Asahi recorded its first annual loss of revenue.In 2009, Hiroshi Hayakawa became the president of the broadcaster, being the first president of TV Asahi who had been serving the broadcaster since its inauguration. Between April and June 2012, TV Asahi won in the Triple Crown ratings for the first time with 12.3% in primetime, 12.7% in evening time, and 7.9% for whole day.

On May 10, 2011, TV Asahi launched its mascot "Go-chan" which was designed by Sanrio.

The transmission of international aquatics competitions, World Cup football matches, and creation of popular late-night TV programs contributed to a rise in ratings for TV Asahi, and lifted the TV station from its popularly ridiculed "perpetual fourth place" finish into second place, right behind Fuji TV, by 2005.

The station also launched its own mascot, also known as  Gō-chan is currently seen on TV Asahi's opening sign-on ID.

Coverage

Current

Broadcasting rights

Football

Soccer 
 FIFA
 National teams
 Men's :
 FIFA World Cup
 Women's :
 FIFA Women's World Cup
JFA
 Japan women's national football team 
 Japan national football team 
AFC
 AFC Asian Cup

Basketball 
FIBA
 FIBA World Cup

Golf 
 U.S. Open
 Open Championship

Wrestling 
 New Japan Pro-Wrestling

Multi-sport events 
FINA
 FINA World Aquatics Championships
 Summer Olympic Games
 Winter Olympic Games
 Asian Games

Programs 
TV Asahi contains not only original anime, but also in particular foreign cartoons, some shows dubbed in Japanese language (like Police Academy, The Smurfs, Adventures of the Gummi Bears, CatDog) and some shows in original and subtitled (like Bonkers, Freakazoid!, Iznogoud).

TV broadcasting
Since 2004, the funding of this station is through sponsorship.

Analog

(until July 24, 2011, only for 44 out of 47 prefectures)

JOEX-TV – TV Asahi Analog Television (テレビ朝日アナログテレビジョン)
 Tokyo Tower – VHF Channel 10
 Tokyo
 Hachiōji – Channel 45
 Tama – Channel 57
 Islands in Tokyo
 Chichijima – Channel 59
 Ibaraki Prefecture
 Mito – Channel 36
 Hitachi – Channel 60
 Tochigi Prefecture
 Utsunomiya – Channel 41
 Gunma Prefecture
 Maebashi – Channel 60
 Saitama Prefecture
 Chichibu – Channel 38
 Chiba Prefecture
 Narita – Channel 59
 Tateyama – Channel 60
 Kanagawa Prefecture
 Yokohama-minato – Channel 60
 Yokosuka-Kurihama – Channel 35
 Hiratsuka – Channel 41
 Okinawa Prefecture
 Kita-Daito – Channel 48
 Minami-Daito – Channel 60

Digital
JOEX-DTV – TV Asahi Digital Television (テレビ朝日デジタルテレビジョン)
 Remote controller ID 5
 Tokyo Sky Tree – UHF Channel 24
 Ibaraki Prefecture
 Mito – Channel 17
 Tochigi Prefecture
 Utsunomiya – Channel 17
 Gunma Prefecture
 Maebashi – Channel 43
 Kanagawa Prefecture
 Hiratsuka – Channel 24

Networks
 Asahi Broadcasting Corporation, Analog Channel 6, Digital Channel 15 [ID: 6] - Headquartered in Osaka, broadcasts in the Kansai area 
 Nagoya Broadcasting Network, Analog Channel 11, Digital Channel 22 [ID: 6] - Headquartered in Nagoya, broadcasts in the Chukyo area
 Hokkaido Television Broadcasting, Analog Channel 35, Digital Channel 23 [ID: 6] - Headquartered in Sapporo, broadcast in Hokkaidō
 Asahi Broadcasting Aomori, Analog Channel 34, Digital Channel 32 [ID: 5] - Headquartered in Aomori, broadcast in Aomori Prefecture
 Iwate Asahi Television, Analog Channel 31, Digital Channel 22 [ID: 5] - Headquartered in Morioka, broadcast in Iwate Prefecture
 Higashinippon Broadcasting, Analog Channel 32, Digital Channel 28 [ID: 5] - Headquartered in Sendai, broadcast in Miyagi Prefecture
 Akita Asahi Broadcasting, Analog Channel 31, Digital Channel 29 [ID: 5] - Headquartered in Akita, broadcast in Akita Prefecture
 Yamagata Television System, Analog Channel 38, Digital Channel 18 [ID: 5] - Headquartered in Yamagata, broadcast in Yamagata Prefecture
 Fukushima Broadcasting, Analog Channel 35, Digital Channel 29 [ID: 5] - Headquartered in Kōriyama, broadcast in Fukushima Prefecture
 The Niigata Television Network 21, Analog Channel 21, Digital Channel 23 [ID: 5] - Headquartered in Niigata, broadcast in Niigata Prefecture
  Hokuriku Asahi Broadcasting, Analog Channel 25, Digital Channel 23 [ID: 5] - Headquartered in Kanazawa, broadcast in Ishikawa Prefecture
 Asahi Broadcasting Nagano, Analog Channel 20, Digital Channel 18 [ID: 5] - Headquartered in Nagano, broadcast in Nagano Prefecture
 Shizuoka Asahi Television, Analog Channel 33, Digital Channel 18 [ID: 5] - Headquartered in Shizuoka, broadcast in Shizuoka Prefecture
 Hiroshima Home TV, Analog Channel 35, Digital Channel 22 [ID: 5] - Headquartered in Hiroshima, broadcast in Hiroshima Prefecture
 Yamaguchi Asahi Broadcasting, Analog Channel 28, Digital Channel 26 - Headquartered in Yamaguchi, broadcast in Yamaguchi Prefecture
 Setonaikai Broadcasting, Analog Channel 25, Digital Channel 30 - Headquartered in Takamatsu, broadcast in Kagawa and Okayama Prefectures
 Ehime Asahi Television, Analog Channel 25, Digital Channel 17 [ID:5] - Headquartered in Matsuyama, broadcast in Ehime Prefecture
 Kyushu Asahi Broadcasting, Analog Channel 1, Digital Channel 31 [ID: 1] - Headquartered in Fukuoka, broadcast in Fukuoka and Saga Prefectures 
 Nagasaki Culture Telecasting, Analog Channel 27, Digital Channel 19 [ID: 5] - Headquartered in Nagasaki, broadcast in Nagasaki Prefecture
 Kumamoto Asahi Broadcasting, Analog Channel 16, Digital Channel 49 [ID: 5] - Headquartered in Kumamoto, broadcast in Kumamoto Prefecture
 Oita Asahi Broadcasting, Analog Channel 24, Digital Channel 32 [ID: 5] - Headquartered in Ōita, broadcast in Ōita Prefecture
 Kagoshima Broadcasting Corporation, Analog Channel 32, Digital Channel 36 [ID: 5] - Headquartered in Kagoshima, broadcast in Kagoshima Prefecture
 Ryukyu Asahi Broadcasting, Analog Channel 28, Digital Channel 16 [ID: 5] - Headquartered in Naha, broadcast in Okinawa Prefecture

See also

 Television in Japan

Notes

References

External links
  - 
 Corporate site - 
 

 
1957 establishments in Japan
All-Nippon News Network
Mass media companies based in Tokyo
Companies listed on the Tokyo Stock Exchange
Toei Company
Asahi Shimbun Company
Japanese-language television stations
Television networks in Japan
Television stations in Japan
Television in Tokyo
Anime companies
Television channels and stations established in 1957
Roppongi